Road food is a cuisine concerning food prepared especially for hungry travelers who arrive by road. Most road food establishments are casual dining restaurants. American road food is associated with "comfort food" such as  hamburgers, hot dogs, fried chicken, barbecue, and pizza. Road food establishments can include fast food, cafes and barbecue shacks.

Road food was the topic of the book Roadfood by Jane and Michael Stern originally published in 1977. Jane Stern also had an ongoing, James Beard Award-winning road food column in Gourmet magazine. Road food has been the subject of several television series, including the three-season series Feasting on Asphalt created by James Beard award winning food author Alton Brown, and Al Roker's Roker on the Road.

Notes and references

Notes

References

Cuisine
Transport culture